Florianopolitan dialect, informally called manezês or manezinho, is a variety of Brazilian Portuguese heavily influenced by (and often considered an extension of) the Azorean dialect. It is spoken by inhabitants of Florianópolis (the capital of Santa Catarina state) of full or predominant Azorean descent and in cities near the capital but with slight variations. The dialect was originally brought by immigrants from Azores who founded several settlements in the Santa Catarina island from the 18th century onwards. The isolation of their settlements made Florianopolitan differ significantly from both Standard European and Brazilian Portuguese.

Once widely spoken in the Santa Catarina island, the Florianopolitan dialect is now almost restricted to the traditional Azorean settlements, and the standard Brazilian Portuguese became the predominant variant for the island inhabitants, many of which come from other parts of Santa Catarina state, other Brazilian states, or even other countries.

Phonology
Florianopolitan is not a uniform dialect, and there are many variations, depending on the community and generation of the speaker. However, here are several principal characteristics of the Florianopolitan dialect speech:

 An 's' is often pronounced  before a 'c', 'p', 'qu', or 'e'. It is also pronounced  at the end of a word, very softly.
 An 's', before a 'd', 'm' or 'n', is pronounced . Thus, mesma (same) is pronounced .
 Both word-initial and preconsonantal  are glottal , but there is some variation. Some speakers, the older generations, use an alveolar trill , as in Spanish, Galician, old varieties and some rural developments of European Portuguese, and some other Southern Brazilian Portuguese dialects. Others pronounce it as a uvular trill  or a voiceless dorsal fricative, velar  or uvular .
 As in Caipira dialects and most speakers of Fluminense dialect, word-final  is deleted unless the next word is without a pause and starts with a vowel.

Forms of address
The Florianopolitan dialect retains forms of address that are obsolete elsewhere in Brazil. 

Tu is used, along with its corresponding verb forms, to address people of the same or lesser age, social or professional status, or to show intimacy, as between relatives or friends. "Você" is reserved for outsiders or to people of lesser status to stress lack of intimacy. Usage is obsolete in most of Brazil but is not exclusive to Florianópolis.

O senhor/A senhora is used to address people of a greater age or status or to preserve a respectful distance. In many families, children (especially adult children) address their parents this way (Standard Portuguese, used in all of Brazil).

Indirect third-person address can be used for those of an intermediate status, especially if one wants to be affectionate or welcoming. A solicitous grandchild might ask, "A avó quer mais café?" A respectful student could say, "O professor pode repetir a pergunta?" A 30-year-old man entering a shop for the first time will be greeted, "Que queria o moço?" (in European Portuguese).

Vocabulary

See also
 Brazilian Portuguese
 Portuguese dialects
 Portuguese phonology

References

Florianópolis
City colloquials
Brazilian Portuguese